Gbegbe IPA: [ɡ͡bɛɡ͡bɛ] is a village in the Ga South Municipal district, a district in the Greater Accra Region of Ghana.

References

Populated places in the Greater Accra Region